The Minaret of Anah or Tower of Anah was a minaret in Iraq which dates back to the Abbasid era. The freestanding tower was located on the western shore of Euphrates river in the old Anah region, Al Anbar Governorate. It was destroyed in 2006, then rebuilt in 2013, and then destroyed again in 2016 by ISIL.

Description
Archaeologists estimate the construction of the tower dates back to the late Abbasid era. It is considered established during the period from 996 to 1096 CE, judging from the Abbasid architectural style, inscriptions and other elements of the building. It was originally built on the island of Labad on the Euphrates river by the Uqaylid dynasty of Mosul. The architectural style was notably different from the other Abbasid era minarets.

It had square shaped platform and 64 niches on the octagonal frame. It was slightly leaning, although the angle was less compared to the Leaning Tower of Pisa.

In the mid-80s, the late president Saddam Hussein inaugurated several dams in Euphrates river in order to secure the stable supply of water, affecting the region where the tower was located and resulted in the potential danger of tower submerging into the water. Team of Iraqi archaeological experts had cooperated with the UAE  mission to dismantle the tower into 28 pieces and relocate into nearby site.

2006 destruction and 2013 restoration
In 2006, the tower was destroyed by the explosion caused by the unknown perpetrator. The explosion was considered among the series of events which targeted Iraqi cultural heritage sites, including the statue of Abu Ja’afar al-Mansur in Baghdad. The Iraqi Accord Front accused Shiite militias for deliberately destroying the cultural heritages built during the Sunni dynasties including the statue of al-Mansur and the top of the Malwiya Minaret.

In 2013, the tower was rebuilt by the work of Iraqi engineers, artists and heritage conservation based on the architectural blueprint preserved by the ministry of tourism. The tower was rebuilt along with the other heritage sites destroyed during the war.

2016 destruction 
The minaret of Anah was destroyed in late 2016 by the Islamic State of Iraq and the Levant as an attempt to destroy the Islamic heritage of Iraq.

Restoration 
The Ministry of Culture of Iraq attempted to restore the minaret in 2021. They also collected fragments from the minaret's ruins.

See also

 Islam in Iraq
 List of mosques in Iraq

References

Abbasid architecture
Buildings and structures demolished in 2016
Buildings and structures destroyed by ISIL
Demolished buildings and structures in Iraq
Anah